Danie Rossouw (born 16 May 1995) is a South African cricketer. He made his first-class debut on 22 February 2021, for Easterns in the 2020–21 CSA 3-Day Provincial Cup. He made his List A debut on 28 February 2021, for Easterns in the 2020–21 CSA Provincial One-Day Challenge. He made his Twenty20 debut on 8 October 2021, for Easterns in the 2021–22 CSA Provincial T20 Knock-Out tournament.

References

External links
 

1995 births
Living people
South African cricketers
Easterns cricketers
Place of birth missing (living people)